London Calling! was a musical revue, produced by André Charlot with music and lyrics by Noël Coward, which opened at London's Duke of York's Theatre on 4 September 1923. It is famous for being Noël Coward's first publicly produced musical work and for the use of a 3-D stereoscopic shadowgraph as part of its opening act. The revue's song "Parisian Pierrot", sung by Gertrude Lawrence, was Coward's first big hit and became one of his signature tunes.

Background and productions

The basis of London Calling! began at the Swiss resort of Davos in Christmas 1922, when Coward presented a musical outline of a new revue project involving himself and Gertrude Lawrence to benefactor Lord Lathom, who was also a friend of André Charlot. Lathom had liked the outline, and approached Charlot to produce it. Charlot's West End musical production Rats, which premiered on 21 February 1923 at the Vaudeville Theatre, also starred Lawrence. At first, Charlot did not have Coward in mind to perform in London Calling!, but Coward used his contractual right of veto to turn down all other suggestions for leading men. Charlot gave way, and paid him a wage of £40 a week with the success of the show.

The revue featured 25 sketches, skits, songs and dance routines, with choreographic assistance by Fred Astaire, who was working in London's Shaftesbury Theatre with his sister Adele at the time. Astaire taught Coward tap-dancing at the nearby Guildhall School of Music. Though a leading lady in West End plays, Lawrence made her singing debut with Coward's musical works, an association that would continue throughout their careers. Lawrence had previously worked with him on the Liverpool production of Gerhart Hauptmann's play Hannele in 1913. The revue sketches made light of London society at the time, with one sketch called "The Swiss Family Whittlebot" poking fun at The Sitwells, known for their avant-garde poetry and ideas.

The revue was directed by Herbert Mason; it opened at the Duke of York's Theatre on 4 September 1923 and ran for 316 performances. The revue was twice revised during its run. Dorothy Clarke and Joyce Barbour replaced Lawrence and Molyneux for the second edition, starting on 1 December 1923. Coward provided two new numbers: "Temperamental honeymoon" (for himself) and "I prefer to be on the safe side" (for Barbour). For the third edition only Maisie Gay remained of the original stars. The new cast included Teddie Gerard, A. W. Baskomb and Lance Lister. Coward wrote two more new numbers: "When we were girls" (for Gay and Baskomb) and "A Spanish grandee" (for Gerard).

Original cast

Noël Coward
Gertrude Lawrence
Maisie Gay
Eileen Molyneux
Tubby Edlin (comedian)
Jessie Matthews (chorine)

Songs
(In the order listed in The Lyrics of Noël Coward, pp. 5–18):
"Tamarisk Town" (Coward) – Gertrude Lawrence
"Other Girls" (Coward) – Noël Coward and chorus
"When My Ship Comes Home" (Coward)
"Carrie" (Coward) – Gertrude Lawrence
"There's Life in the Old Girl Yet" (Coward) – Maisie Gay and chorus
"Russian Blues" (Coward) – Gertrude Lawrence and chorus
"Prenez Garde, Lisette" (Coward) – Maisie Gay
"Sentiment" (Philip Braham and Coward) – Noël Coward
"Parisian Pierrot" (Coward) – Gertrude Lawrence
"What Love Means to Girls Like Me" (Coward) – Maisie Gay
"When We Were Girls Together" (Coward) – Maisie Gay and chorus
"Spanish Grandee" (Coward) – Teddie Gerard and chorus

Other numbers performed:
"Temperamental Honeymoon" (Coward) – Noël Coward and chorus
"You Were Meant for Me" (Eubie Blake and Noble Sissle) – sung as a final duet between Coward and Lawrence

Shadowgraph and connections with radio
The opening act of London Calling! utilised Laurens Hammond's patented 3-D shadowgraph process, which required the patrons to wear special colour-tinted glasses. American inventor Hammond had earlier developed a Teleview sequential viewing system for use as part of the successful productions of the Ziegfeld Follies (1907–1931). Its use influenced producer André Charlot, who was in the United States at the time of the Follies, to attempt something similar in Europe. Because the patent did not have immediate effect in foreign countries, Hammond was unable to collect any royalties from the production of London Calling!. With the success of the show, Charlot became referred to as "the British Ziegfeld", a title he loathed.

Apart from the influence between productions on the use of shadowgraph, the first song title mentioning the medium of radio was in the Ziegfeld Follies of 1922. The name of the song was "Listening on Some Radio". The phrase "London Calling!" was the call sign of BBC Radio in London (2LO), which also began transmitting in 1922.

See also
Ziegfeld Follies

Notes

References
Coward, Noël. The Lyrics of Noël Coward, Heinemann, London, 1965.

1923 musicals
Revues
West End musicals
Musicals by Noël Coward
British musicals